Gugu Gumede is a South African actress born in the Province of Natal. She is well known for portraying the character of a prophetess, Mamlambo, in the soapie Uzalo.

Early life
Gumede was born in the province of Natal. Her father was Simon Hulumeni Gumede and her mother was Zanele kaMagwaza-Msibi. She studied acting at the American Academy of Dramatic Arts in Los Angeles.

Career
In 2013, Gumede returned from the United States and landed a role as Mandisa in Generations, one of the most successful shows in South Africa.

In 2015, Gumede was cast to portray the character of Mamlambo on the most viewed television show in South Africa, Uzalo.

In 2018, she presented the 11th Crown Gospel Music Awards alongside Somizi Mhlongo, Rebecca Malope, Clement Maosa and other celebrities.

Filmography

Television

Personal life

Gumede is a born-again Christian.

Gugu gave birth to her daughter on 24 March 2022.

See also

 Generations
 Uzalo

References 

1991 births
Living people
People from Durban
People from KwaZulu-Natal
Zulu people
South African actresses